Oussama Omrani (born 10 March 1992) is a Tunisian footballer who plays as a defender for Saudi Second Division side Arar.

References

External links
 

1992 births
Living people
Tunisian footballers
Tunisian expatriate footballers
LPS Tozeur players
ES Métlaoui players
EO Sidi Bouzid players
CO Médenine players
US Tataouine players
Al-Najma SC players
Al-Sadd FC (Saudi football club) players
Arar FC players
Tunisian Ligue Professionnelle 1 players
Saudi Second Division players
Expatriate footballers in Saudi Arabia
Tunisian expatriate sportspeople in Saudi Arabia
Association football defenders